Ants Pärna (16 August 1935 Alatskivi Parish – 31 December 2014 Tallinn) was an Estonian maritime historian and poet.

In 1969 he graduated from the University of Tartu with a degree in history.

From 1961 until 1998, he was the head of Estonian Maritime Museum.

Poetry collections
 "Poeem laevast "Estonia"" Tallinn, 1999
 "Mu meri" Tallinn, 2001
 "Mu arm". Tallinn, 2002
 "Mu aeg" Tallinn, 2003
 "Mu mõte" Tallinn, 2004
 "Mu tunne". Tallinn, 2006
 "Mu laev". Tallinn, 2007

References

1935 births
2014 deaths
20th-century Estonian historians
Estonian male poets
20th-century Estonian poets
21st-century Estonian poets
University of Tartu alumni
People from Peipsiääre Parish